Moses Taft 2nd (January 16, 1812 – April 2, 1893) was born at Uxbridge, Massachusetts. He was significant as an early American Industrialist and financier in the historic Blackstone Valley, and a member of the famous Taft family.

Birth parents and family
Moses Taft was the second child to Luke Taft and Nancy Wood Taft. Moses married Sylvia Ann Wheelock daughter of Jerry Wheelock and Sukey Day, on 27 April 1834 at Uxbridge. He latter married Emeline Newell Taft (Wing) who was the daughter of Timothy Taft and Polly Marsh, on 12 January 1858 at Uxbridge.

Early life and career
Moses Taft, 2nd, was a 19th-century figure from Uxbridge, Massachusetts. Moses Taft's father, Luke Taft, was an early woolen mill pioneer in Uxbridge, Massachusetts. The Blackstone River Valley is the earliest industrialized region in the United States. Moses Taft was born in Uxbridge, Worcester County, Massachusetts, January 16, 1812. He attended local  district schools, the Uxbridge Academy, and the Friends school in Bolton, taught by Thomas Fry. His training path prepared him for the manufacture of "satinets". He consistently pursued manufacturing, both independently, and with Samuel W. Scott, in Burrillville, Rhode Island. Next he worked with James W. Day, as Taft, Day & Company, and later after Mr. Day left, the firm became known as Taft & Capron. His other manufacturing interests were in Caryville, Northborough, and Southborough, Massachusetts and at Proctor, Vermont.   Mr. Taft was president of the Blackstone bank, and the Uxbridge Savings Bank. Taft represented Uxbridge in the Massachusetts state legislature in 1847, and was frequently called to serve on the Board of Selectmen. He was a member and officer of the First Congregational Society of Uxbridge, and of the Uxbridge Lodge of International Order of Odd-fellows. He was widely known as a successful manufacturer and financier, and was closely allied to the prosperity of this town."

Significance of his local industries
He was an important industrialist in the Blackstone Valley, America's first industrialized region. Moses Taft built a woolen mill on the Blackstone River at Uxbridge, circa 1852. The mill ran 24/7 during the  American Civil War. Union Blue Uniforms were made at Moses Taft's Mill in historic Uxbridge. Moses Taft was a descendant of the famous Taft family in America which had its roots in Uxbridge. By the mid-1850s the mills of Uxbridge were producing 2.5 million yards (2 million square meters) of cloth yearly. Some of the earliest improvements of textiles, and their industrial processes occurred in the Uxbridge Mills including the Moses Taft mill, also known as the Calumet Mill. In later years after 1910, this historic mill became  known as Wheelock Mill or Stanley Woolen, and then became part of the Blackstone River Valley National Heritage Corridor, and was also used in the production of several movies including Oliver's Story, and The Great Gatsby.

Citations from the Blackstone Daily

Uxbridge Walking Tour 146 Mendon is the site of the Stanley Woolen Mill, originally known as the Central Woolen Mill in Calumet Village. It is mostly vacant, yet a portion of the huge wooden buildings house a spacious antique store and is the subject of future visioning sessions by State, federal and local partnerships. In 1852, Moses Taft built the mill and leased it to Israel Southwick and Richard Sayles. During the Civil Way, 24-hour production of indigo blue uniform cloth was ongoing before the mill was sold to Robert and Jacob Taft in 1865. Soon after, they built a dam at Rice City Pond which considerably increased the water power. In 1866, an  steam engine was installed and production continued to rise dramatically as the mill started producing fancy cassimeres as the name changed to the Calumet Woolen Company. Arthur and Stanley Wheelock bought the mill after 1905 and during World War I, a half million yards of khaki for the US government was produced as well  as cloth for the French and Italian governments. This was the longest running family-owned woolen mill in the US until it closed in 1988.  See also the link for Wheelocksville.

Death and afterwards
Moses Taft 2nd died April 2, 1893 at Uxbridge, Worcester County, Massachusetts at the age of 82. The Moses Taft Mill is now also known as the "Central Woolen Mills District" and is listed on the National Register of Historic Places.

See also
The Tafts of Mendon and Uxbridge
Taft family

Notes

1812 births
1893 deaths
People from Uxbridge, Massachusetts
Members of the Massachusetts House of Representatives
American textile industry businesspeople
People of the Industrial Revolution
19th-century American politicians
19th-century American businesspeople